Vanessa Agbortabi (born 4 December 1998) is a German volleyball player.

Career 
She participated in the 2015 FIVB Volleyball Girls' U18 World Championship, 2017 FIVB Volleyball Women's U20 World Championship, and the 2018 FIVB Volleyball Women's Nations League.

References

External links 

 FIVB profile
 CEV profile

1998 births
Living people
German women's volleyball players
People from Main-Taunus-Kreis
Sportspeople from Darmstadt (region)